Mia Murano (Japanese: 邑野みあ/邑野未亜/Murano Mia, born July 22, 1986, in Otsu, Shiga, Japan) is a Japanese model and actress.

Filmography

TV series
Sensei, shiranaino? (1998)
Saiko metorâ EIJI 2 (1999)
Eien no ko (2000)
Kikujirō to Saki (2001)
Rinshō shinrishi (2002)
Yankee bokō ni kaeru (2003)
STAND UP!! (2003)
Kotobuki Wars (2004)
Rikon Bengoshi (2004)
Seishun no mon: Chikuhō-hen (2005)

Movies
Karaoke (1998)
Tomie: Re-birth (2001)
Engawa no inu (2001)
MAKOTO (2005)

TV ads
Kagome "Rokujōmugicha" Japanese tea (1999)
Square Enix Unlimited Saga (2001)
Suntory "Minamiarupusu no tennensui" mineral water (2002)
Coca-Cola Japan "Coca-Cola" soft drink (2005)

Video Games
Flower, Sun, and Rain (2001)

References

External links
 

Japanese actresses
Japanese gravure idols
People from Ōtsu, Shiga
1986 births
Living people